Richard Alexander Oswald (17 February 1771 – 19 June 1841) was a Scottish Liberal Party politician who sat in the House of Commons from 1832 to 1835.

Life
Oswald was the son of George Oswald, a merchant of Scotstoun, Rector of Glasgow University and the grand nephew of Richard Oswald of Auchincruive.

At the 1832 general election Oswald was elected as the Member of Parliament (MP) for Ayrshire. He held the seat until 1835.

Oswald died at the age of 70.

Family

Oswald married twice. His first wife was Louisa or Lucy Johnstone; the poet Robert Burns composed his verses, "O wat ye wha's in yon town?" to her. She died of consumption at Lisbon. Oswald then married in 1817 Lady Lilias Montgomerie, daughter of Hugh Montgomerie, 12th Earl of Eglinton, who was widow of Robert Dundas MacQue(e)n.

Oswald and Louisa had a son, Richard Oswald. He married Lady Mary Kennedy, daughter of Archibald Kennedy, 1st Marquess of Ailsa, and died in 1833. The family estates passed to a cousin, James Oswald, in 1841.
 
Thomas Spencer Lindsey married in 1818 Oswald's daughter Margaret Hester. Margaret Hester Oswald was described in an obituary as "the only daughter of the late Richard Alexander Oswald, Esq. of Auchencruive" Oswald's will shows that a beneficiary was a granddaughter Margaret Nina Lindsey.

References

External links
 

1771 births
1841 deaths
UK MPs 1832–1835
Members of the Parliament of the United Kingdom for Scottish constituencies
Politicians from Glasgow
Scottish Liberal Party MPs